John P. Healey (March 7, 1922 – March 15, 2019) was an American aerospace executive manager. He was best known for his role in the redesign and manufacture of the command modules for the Apollo program after the catastrophic launch pad fire that took the lives of Command Pilot Virgil I. "Gus" Grissom, Senior Pilot Ed White and Pilot Roger B. Chaffee on January 27, 1967 (Apollo 1). He died in March 2019 at the age of 97.

Early life and education
Healey grew up on Normal Avenue in Baltimore, Maryland, the son of Irish immigrants. His father was a stone cutter and his mother worked as a maid. As a boy, he attended St. Paul's elementary school where he played baseball while working for the local grocer after school. He attended Baltimore City College and played soccer in the state tournament against Annapolis.

From aircraft to missiles
After serving in the Navy during World War II, Healey went to work for the Glenn L. Martin Company in Baltimore, Maryland. From his start as an aircraft quality inspector to his role leading manufacturing and quality control for the Titan missile program, he gained a reputation for being tough but fair, and for his ability to motivate the organization to get the job done right.

The lifting power and reliability of Titan missiles led to its selection and use in the NASA Gemini program of crewed space capsules in the mid-1960s. Twelve Titan IIs were used to launch two U.S. uncrewed Gemini test launches and ten two-seat crewed capsules. All of the launches were successes.

Apollo program
 After the catastrophic launch pad fire that took the lives of Command Pilot Virgil I. "Gus" Grissom, Senior Pilot Ed White and Pilot Roger B. Chaffee in January 1967, Healey was recruited by Bill Bergen, President of North American Aviation Space Division, as the spacecraft manager for the redesign of the Apollo Command Module (November 1967). 
Healey was expected to set precedents in guiding a nearly perfect spacecraft through the factory. Many doubted, Bergen later said, that the recovery could be made in a reasonable time because "everything had come to a screeching halt." Bergen credited the assignment of Borman and his group, and Healey's performance as manager of spacecraft as the keys to getting command module production back into line. When the command module (Block II Apollo CSM-101) arrived at the Cape in May 1968, the receiving inspectors found fewer discrepancies than on any spacecraft previously delivered to Kennedy space center. By the end of the program, Healey was Rockwell's VP for Apollo and Stage II of the Saturn V rocket.

Lancer to system development
After Apollo, Healey was assigned to the Rockwell B-1 Lancer program; a supersonic strategic bomber designed to replace the aging B-52.

The B-1A mockup review had occurred in late October 1971 and there had been 297 requests for alterations.  Under Healey's management, the first of four prototype B-1A models (s/n 74-0158) flew on December 23, 1974. Due to the politics of the era and programs competing for funding, it would be more than a decade before the first production B-1B aircraft would fly.

During this period Healey was responsible for upgrading Rockwell's civilian aircraft, the Commander 112/114, and bringing them to an efficient production level. Engines were replaced with more powerful versions, the wing was redesigned internally to increase fuel capacity, and a turbo-charged model was introduced. As the market potential for this class of civilian aircraft later declined, Rockwell sold this line to Gulfstream American who discontinued production. 

Healey left Rockwell to manage a military aircraft program taking the Fairchild-Republic A-10 Thunderbolt II, a close air support (CAS) aircraft, from prototype to production.  Selected by the Air Force over its rival from Northrop, the YA-9, in January 1973, the first production A-10 flew in October 1975 and deliveries to operational units commenced within 6 months.

Healey then joined System Development Corporation (SDC) as an executive manager for ongoing government contracts with the Department of Defense (DoD), National Aeronautics and Space Administration (NASA), Department of Energy (DoE), and other government agencies. In 1980, SDC was acquired by the Burroughs Corporation and later merged with the Sperry Corporation to form Unisys. Healey promoted the development of program control systems and the automation of project management throughout his career and was retired from Unisys.

Constellation program

Healey, coming out of retirement, joined the Lockheed Martin Orion team in 2008.  
The Orion spacecraft designs are based substantially on the Apollo command and service module (Apollo CSM) flown between 1967 and 1975, but include advances derived from other technology programs, including; control systems from the Boeing 787, "autodock" features from Russian/European spacecraft, waste-management systems based on Skylab, the Space Shuttle, and the International Space Station, and the most advanced computers ever put into a spacecraft. "Going with known technology and known solutions lowers the risk," according to Neil Woodward, director of the integration office in the Exploration Systems Mission Directorate.

The goals of Orion include:

It was an element of NASA's Project Constellation, which was planned to send human explorers back to the Moon by 2020, and then onward to Mars and other destinations in the Solar System.

In popular culture
In the HBO miniseries From the Earth to the Moon, episode entitled "We Have Cleared the Tower", the role of John Healey was played by Brandon Smith.

References

1922 births
2019 deaths
1965 in spaceflight
1966 in spaceflight
1967 in spaceflight
1968 in spaceflight
1969 in spaceflight
United States Navy personnel of World War II
American people of Irish descent
Burroughs Corporation people
NASA people
People from Baltimore